South China Global Talent Institute is a think tank focusing on the study of international talents. Headquartered in Guangzhou (Canton), the institute serves as a part of the South Start-up Service Center of the "Thousand-talent Plan", which is administered by the Organization Department of the Chinese Communist Party. The Institute was officially established in October, 2012. Wang Huiyao, the Vice Chairman of the United Front Work Department's Western Returned Scholars Association (WRSA) and Director General of Center for China and Globalization, acts as the founding director.

Background 
In response to China’s strategy of reinvigorating the country through human resources development, the Organization Department of CCP launched the Thousand Talents Plan in 2008. Proposed by Li Yuanchao, the Chinese Vice-President, who then acted as the head of the Organization Department, the South Start-up Service Center was created at the end of 2012. As part of the Center, South China Global Talent Institute was founded at the same time. Leaders from the Talents Bureau of the Organization Department of the CCP Central Committee, the Ministry of Human Resources and Social Security, Guangdong provincial government and Guangzhou municipal government jointly inaugurated the institute.

Positioning 
Cooperating with the Center for China and Globalization, South China Global Talent Institute provides intellectual support for corporations as well as government agencies on talent issues. Activities include events, publications and research.

Research projects 
 International Talent Strategy Research
 Improvement on Green Card System of China
 Cooperation of Overseas Returnees and Local Private Enterprises
 Development of Overseas Chinese Professional Associations
 Advisory Report on Improving "Thousand-Talent" Plan

Publications 
 China and Globalization Research
 Globalizing China
 Global Talent Briefing
 Policy Recommendation References
 Immigration Tide
 National Strategy: Talents Will Change the World
 Talent War
 Movers on Wall Street
 The Blue Book Series

Events 
 Beijing Forum of WRSA
 Global Talents Conference
 Annual International Forum
 High-level Foreign Experts Seminar
 Round Table Meeting on International Talent Issues

References

External links 

 
 

Think tanks based in China
Organizations based in Guangzhou
Think tanks established in 2012
2012 establishments in China